Ceiber David Ávila Segura (born 26 May 1989) is a Colombian boxer. He competed in the men's flyweight event at the 2016 Summer Olympics. In June 2021, he qualified to represent Colombia at the 2020 Summer Olympics.

References

External links
 
 
 Ceiber David Ávila Segura at Noticias Caracol

1989 births
Living people
Colombian male boxers
Olympic boxers of Colombia
Boxers at the 2016 Summer Olympics
Central American and Caribbean Games gold medalists for Colombia
Competitors at the 2018 Central American and Caribbean Games
Place of birth missing (living people)
South American Games silver medalists for Colombia
South American Games medalists in boxing
Competitors at the 2018 South American Games
Boxers at the 2011 Pan American Games
Boxers at the 2015 Pan American Games
Boxers at the 2019 Pan American Games
Pan American Games silver medalists for Colombia
Pan American Games medalists in boxing
Flyweight boxers
Central American and Caribbean Games medalists in boxing
Medalists at the 2015 Pan American Games
Boxers at the 2020 Summer Olympics
20th-century Colombian people
21st-century Colombian people